Muhammad Hashim is a Pakistani politician who has been a member of the National Assembly of Pakistan since August 2018.

Political career
He was elected to the National Assembly of Pakistan from Constituency NA-268 (Chagai-cum-Nushki-cum-Kharan) as a candidate of Balochistan National Party (Mengal) in 2018 Pakistani general election.

References

Living people
Pakistani MNAs 2018–2023
Balochistan National Party (Mengal) MNAs
Year of birth missing (living people)